Grace Hightower De Niro  is an American philanthropist, socialite, actress, and singer. She married Robert De Niro in 1997, and they separated in 2018.

Career
As a philanthropist, Hightower launched Grace Hightower & Coffees of Rwanda in 2013 with the mission of improving Rwandan livelihoods by marketing their products internationally. She is a board member of the New York Women's Foundation and the New York Fund for Public Schools as well as a member of Ronald Perelman's Women's Heart Health Advisory Council and the International Women's Coffee Alliance. Hightower has been honored for her work by numerous institutions including the American Cancer Society of New York City.

As a socialite, Hightower's gala 55th birthday party was covered in Vogue magazine by André Leon Talley. In 2010, she presented the Pratt Institute's Creative Spirit Award to director Lee Daniels.

As an actress, Hightower has had minor roles in various movies including Precious (2009) and The Paperboy (2012). Additionally, she had a minor part in the ABC TV series, NYPD Blue, in the 1994 Season One episode entitled "Zeppo Marks Brothers".

As a singer, she performed the lead vocals for the track, "Somethin's Comin' My Way", written by Dan Manjovi for the 2009 Precious movie soundtrack.

Personal life
Hightower is of African-American descent and was raised in Kilmichael, Mississippi. She grew up in poverty, and worked various odd jobs to help support her family. Hightower became a flight attendant for Trans World Airlines, attracted by the possibility of traveling and expanding her horizons. Settling in Paris and later London, she worked variously as a mutual fund trader and restaurant worker. In 1987, while working at Mr. Chow, an upscale London Chinese restaurant and celebrity hangout, she met and began dating Robert De Niro.

Hightower and De Niro married in 1997. In 1998, she gave birth to the couple's first child. De Niro filed for divorce in 1999 and sued Hightower for custody of their son in 2001. The two resolved their differences, however, and by 2004 the divorce was dropped and they renewed their vows. In 2011 the couple had their second child, via surrogate. The couple separated in November 2018.

Filmography

Film

Television

References

External links

 

Living people
African-American actresses
American film actresses
American television actresses
American people of Blackfoot descent
People from Kilmichael, Mississippi
Flight attendants
De Niro family
Year of birth missing (living people)